Kazuto (written: 一翔, 一人, 一登, 一仁, 一斗, 一刀, 和人, 麗斗 or カズト in katakana) is a masculine Japanese given name. Notable people with the name include:

, Japanese guitarist, member of the rock band High and Mighty Color
, Japanese sailor
, Japanese boxer
, Japanese footballer
, Japanese animator, character designer and anime director
, Japanese sumo wrestler
, Japanese footballer
, Japanese footballer
, Japanese motorcycle racer
, Japanese yacht racer
, Japanese baseball player
, Japanese footballer

Fictional characters
, protagonist of the visual novel series Koihime Musō
, protagonist of the manga series The World of Narue
, protagonist of the light novel series Sword Art Online
Kazuto Tokino male protagonist of the anime/manga series "UFO Ultramaiden Valkyrie"

Japanese masculine given names